Carol Burnett & Company is an American four-episode summer variety/sketch comedy television show starring Carol Burnett, Tim Conway, Vicki Lawrence, Kenneth Mars and Craig Richard Nelson. The series served as a continuation of The Carol Burnett Show (1967–1978) and aired on ABC on four consecutive Saturday nights from August 18, 1979, to September 8, 1979.

Production
In the spring of 1979 – a year after The Carol Burnett Show had completed its eleven-season run on CBS – Carol Burnett and her then husband-manager Joe Hamilton were dining in a restaurant with friends (including Tim Conway from The Carol Burnett Show). At that gathering, Burnett started reminiscing about the old show and making suggestions to Conway of future comedy sketches that she wished they could create if the show was still running. Hamilton suggested to Burnett that she do a summer series; Conway immediately agreed.

Taking that idea, Burnett and Hamilton then approached CBS about doing a four-week program in the summer of 1979, but CBS already had their schedule filled for the summer months and rejected the idea. However, ABC was interested and as a result, four postscript episodes of The Carol Burnett Show were produced and most of Burnett's former staff and crew were on board for the new series.

Under the new title Carol Burnett & Company, the series was produced by Joe Hamilton and continued the same format of The Carol Burnett Show — featuring comedy sketches and musical numbers, including favorite characters/sketches such as "Mrs. Wiggins", "The Family", "As the Stomach Turns", and Carol Burnett's impersonation of Queen Elizabeth II.

Her Carol Burnett Show co-stars Tim Conway and Vicki Lawrence were back as regulars; due to the unavailability of Harvey Korman, comic actors Kenneth Mars and Craig Richard Nelson were added to the supporting cast; Ernie Flatt, who had been the choreographer on The Carol Burnett Show during its entire run, was replaced by the show's lead dancer Don Crichton. The guest stars during the four-week period were chronologically Cheryl Ladd, Alan Arkin, Penny Marshall and Sally Field.  The show also introduced new sketches and characters, including another one of Conway's creations: a preacher named "Rolly D. Tucker" who gave humorously misguided sermons about life, with shouts of "It don't matter!" interspersed throughout his dissertation.

Much of the staff that worked on Carol Burnett & Company would move on to Conway's eponymous variety show when it premiered in March 1980; Conway brought the Rolly D. Tucker character with him to that series.

Episode list

References

External links

1979 American television series debuts
1979 American television series endings
1970s American sketch comedy television series
1970s American variety television series
American Broadcasting Company original programming
English-language television shows
Television series by CBS Studios
Carol Burnett